Alexander M. Alling may refer to:
Alexander M. Alling (New York), a member of the 70th New York State Legislature
Alexander M. Alling (Wisconsin), a member of the Wisconsin State Assembly